Ctislav Doseděl (born 10 August 1970), also known as Sláva Doseděl, is a former tennis player from the Czech Republic, who turned professional in 1989.

Career
Doseděl won three singles titles and one doubles titles during his career. The right-hander reached the quarter-finals of the 1999 US Open by defeating Jim Courier, Fernando Meligeni, Fredrik Jonsson and Jiří Novák before losing to Todd Martin. He also got to the semifinals of the 1994 Rome Masters and achieved his career-high ATP singles ranking of World No. 26 in October 1994. His tennis career ended with the 2001 US Open.

Doseděl is still involved in professional tennis post retirement and is, as of June 2012, coaching top 100 singles player Lukáš Rosol and most recently top 250 player Jonáš Forejtek of the Czech Republic.

Personal life
Doseděl appeared in a 1999 Czech movie titled "Life Water" (Voda života), telling the life of Vincent Priessnitz who found cure for high fever during the 19th century.

ATP Career Finals

Doubles: 6 (3 title, 3 runner-ups)

Doubles: 1 (1 title)

ATP Challenger and ITF Futures finals

Singles: 12 (5–7)

Doubles: 5 (3–2)

Performance timelines

Singles

Doubles

External links
 
 
 

1970 births
Living people
Czech expatriate sportspeople in Monaco
Czech male tennis players
Czechoslovak male tennis players
Olympic tennis players of the Czech Republic
Sportspeople from Přerov
Tennis players at the 2000 Summer Olympics